Port Clarence is a census-designated place (CDP) in Nome Census Area, Alaska.  The population was 24 at the 2010 census, up from 21 in 2000. It is located on the spit separating Port Clarence Bay from the Bering Strait.

History
Missionary Sheldon Jackson's greatest success with his Teller Reindeer Station at Port Clarence, figured in the Overland Relief Expedition in 1897 to save marooned whalers near Point Barrow.

During the 1898-1899 gold rush in Nome, smaller quantities of both gold and high-grade tin were mined in Port Clarence.

The Harriman Alaska Expedition visited Port Clarence in 1899, making a photographic record of Alaska Natives.

In 1900, the U.S. Coast and Geodetic Survey charted the coastline.

From 1961–2010 Port Clarence was a LORAN-C station administered by the U.S. Coast Guard. The LORAN-C Program was terminated Feb. 8, 2010.

The U.S. Coast Guard commissioned a 1350 ft. (411.48 metre) tall Loran-C tower in 1961. It was the tallest structure in Alaska until its demolition in 2010.

Geography
Port Clarence is located at  (65.265974, -166.852765).

Demographics

Port Clarence first appeared on the 1890 U.S. Census as an unincorporated area of 485 residents. Of those, 276 were White, 144 were Natives, 62 were "Other" and 3 were Asian. The census enumerators included 11 small native villages of Anelo, Chainruk, Kachegaret, Kalulegeet, Kaveazruk, Kovogzruk, Metukatoak, Nuk, Perebluk, Shinnapago & Toakzruk. They also included the following six vessels that were in the area as well: the whaling steamers J.H. Freeman & Grampus; barques Bounding Billow & Reindeer; and the brigs F.A. Barstow & W.H. Meyer. Port Clarence would not be separately reported again on the census until 1980, when it was made a census-designated place (CDP).

As of the census of 2000, there were 21 people, 4 households, and 3 families residing in the CDP. The population density was 0.6 people per square mile (0.2/km2). The racial makeup of the CDP was 90.48% White. 4.76% (i.e., one person) of the population was Black or African American, 4.76% were from other races, and 4.76% were Hispanic or Latino of any race.

In the CDP, the age distribution of the population shows 33.3% from 18 to 24, 66.7% from 25 to 44. The median age was 28 years. The 21 residents counted by the census included one woman and 20 men.

The per capita income for the CDP was $35,286. There were no families and none of the population living below the poverty line.

Climate

References

Census-designated places in Alaska
Census-designated places in Nome Census Area, Alaska
Census-designated places in Unorganized Borough, Alaska
Populated coastal places in Alaska on the Pacific Ocean
Populated places in the Seward Peninsula